The 1971 Torneio do Norte or Taça Norte was the fourth and last edition of a football competition held in Brazil, featuring 12 clubs. Remo won your third title and earn the right to play in the 1971 Torneio Norte-Nordeste.

Amazonas selective

Quarter-final

|}

Semi-final

|}

Final

|}

Pará selective

Finals

Remo won 5–2 on aggregate.

References

Torneio do Norte
Torneio do Norte
Torneio do Norte